James F. Miller was the 24th mayor of New Orleans (January 30, 1863 – September 12, 1863 and November 6, 1863 – February 2, 1864).

Mayors of New Orleans